Joseph de Pons-Guimera Baron de Montclair (1625 in Montclar1690 in Landau) was French cavalry general.

Commander in chief of the Alsace, he implacably executed the orders of Louis XIV and Louvois.  In 1676 the king ordered the destruction of Haguenau, which he accomplished in January 1677. The same year he destroyed many more fortresses.

In the War of the Grand Alliance, he took part in the destruction of large parts of the Palatinate.

1625 births
1690 deaths
Barons of France
French generals
Place of birth missing